Edward Francis Gleason (November 9, 1869 – April 9, 1944) was an American sport shooter who competed in the 1912 Summer Olympics.

Biography
He was born on November 9, 1869 in Hyannis, Massachusetts. In 1912 he won the gold medal as member of the American team in the team clay pigeons competition. In the individual trap event he finished ninth. He died on April 9, 1944.

References

External links
profile

1869 births
1944 deaths
American male sport shooters
Shooters at the 1912 Summer Olympics
Olympic gold medalists for the United States in shooting
Trap and double trap shooters
Olympic medalists in shooting
Medalists at the 1912 Summer Olympics
People from Hyannis, Massachusetts
Sportspeople from Barnstable County, Massachusetts
19th-century American people
20th-century American people